University Human Rights Centers are centers established at universities for the purpose of promoting human rights and social justice locally, nationally, and globally through education, fieldwork, and other efforts.

Human Rights Center – University of California, Berkeley

The Human Rights Center (HRC) at UC Berkeley was established in 1994 as part of their School of Law.  This center works to promote human rights and justice at a global level.  The faculty and staff of the HRC have collaborated with leading human rights organizations specializing in the promotion of justice and post-war reconstruction in countries that have been torn apart by war.

The HRC at Berkeley lists 3 core goals that guide its service:
 Pursue accountability for mass atrocities
 Ensure the needs of survivors are heard
 Strengthen the research and advocacy capacities of local and international human rights organizations

This HRC has devoted a number of its projects to war crimes, including genocide. Current projects include documentation of exposure to violence, and forced conscription in Northern Uganda.  They are also investigating the experiences of the former detainees who were held at the U.S. military installation at Guantanamo Bay in Cuba. Concerning health injustice, the HRC is investigating mental health problems in Albania as well as access to healthcare for workers in post-Katrina New Orleans. In the Summer of 2010, the HRC announced the beginning of its Sexual Violence and Accountability Project where they will study the role of safe shelters in both peacetime communities as well as communities displaced by conflict.

The HRC's current executive director Alexa Koenig holds a J.D. from the University of San Francisco School of Law, an M.A. from UC Berkeley, and is in the final stages of completing her Ph.D. in UC Berkeley’s Jurisprudence and Social Policy program. HRC's former director (currently Faculty Director of the HRC), Dr. Eric Stover, is known for his work in uncovering evidence to prosecute crimes against humanity and returning remains to the victim’s families in genocide cases.

Human Rights Center – University of Minnesota

The Human Rights Center at the University of Minnesota was inaugurated in December 1988 on the fortieth anniversary of the Universal Declaration of Human Rights.  Their purpose is to assist human rights advocates, students, educators, and volunteers in promoting a culture of human rights on the local, national, and international level.
 
On February 4, 2011 the HRC launched the Islamic Law and Human Rights Program.  This program will “engage in research, scholarship, and educational and practical activities on issues of Islamic law, human rights, rule of law, and terrorism.”

The HRC maintains a website that gives updates on the International Women’s Rights Activist Watch and a K-12 Human Rights Education Initiative and Curriculum.

In 2010, the HRC initiated a Close the Gap initiative, which was a learning resource that focused on issues of race, class, and place disparities in the Twin Cities and Greater Minnesota.  The HRC hopes that these educational tools will help others to take action towards ending these inequalities.  Potential projects stemming from this initiative include students interviewing parents to dissolve barriers preventing parental involvement in schools and working with the Carpenters Union to introduce children to apprenticeships and technical education as an alternative to college.

Issues of focus for the HRC in 2010 included but were not limited to fair trade, immigration and asylum, indigenous rights,  public health, torture, women’s rights, and wrongful convictions.

Weissbrodt, founder of the Human Rights Center, is notorious for his work on the Guantanamo detainee cases.  He organized law students through the HRC to help with work on legal research and briefing.  He argued that charges against Bahlul did not constitute war crimes under international law and that Guantanamo detainees are put at a disadvantage because they are not entitled to a defense counsel until they have already been charged.

Duke Human Rights Center

The Duke Human Rights Center is an organization of Duke University that is home to a variety of scholar initiatives. The DHRC “seeks to lead university-wide scholarly conversations, collaborations, and programs on human rights, bringing together the humanities and social sciences with public policy and law.”

This center sees the history of the American South, predominantly the role of slavery and segregation, as being integrally important to their practice and study of human rights.  In 2009, the university launched the Pauli Murray Project which is a program that makes use of human rights thinking and techniques to branch out in the Durham community, seeking reconciliation regarding past practices of segregation and slavery. In November 2011, the DHRC announced that it would unveil a historic marker in honor of Pauli Murray.  She was co-founder for the National Organization for Women and the country’s first black, female Episcopal priest.  The marker was placed near her childhood home in Durham, NC.
The Pauli Murray Project is working to restore the Murray home and director of the project, Barbara Lau, urged audience members at the unveiling to donate to the cause.

Duke is home to Genocide Convention author Rafael Lemkin and Dr. Peter Storey who co-chaired the Peace Accord structures that intervened in political violence which occurred before South Africa’s first democratic elections.

The DHRC commonly shows films pertaining to social justice that are kept in an archive for the university and shown free of charge.  In 2011, they offered a viewing of a series of documentaries exploring issues of immigration, refugee rights, the justice system, and the environment called “Rights! Camera! Action!”

Buffalo Human Rights Center

The BHRC is a part of The State University of New York Buffalo Law School.  The BHRC maintains goals that include the organization of internships with leading human rights organizations throughout the world.  They maintain relations with human rights organizations, universities, and government agencies.  In addition, they seek to gain attention for human rights topics in the Buffalo community by organizing speakers, conferences, and symposia with leading human rights speakers.  They hope “to garner greater exposure and community support for the recognition, promotion, and protection of international human rights.”

In 1994, the BHRC founded the Buffalo Journal of International Law, which was renamed in 1997 as the Buffalo Human Rights Law Review. The BHRLR “seeks to unite professionals, students, legal practitioners, policymakers, advocates, and cross-disciplinary scholars, and to encourage the development and practical application of human rights law.”

The BHRC organized a speaker series called The Comparative Human Rights and Practice series in the spring of 2010.  This series included talks about justice in Sierra Leone, international politics of civilian protection, sex trafficking in the United States, indigenous rights in the Americas, and refugee and asylum law.  The events were free and open to the general public.

The Global Campus of Human Rights

The Global Campus of Human Rights is a global network of over 100 universities working on the advancement of Human Rights and Democratisation through seven Regional Programmes:
 EMA, The European Master’s Programme in Human Rights and Democratisation, coordinated by the European Inter-University Centre for Human Rights and Democratisation (EIUC) in Venice.
 HRDA, The Master’s Programme in Human Rights and Democratisation in Africa, coordinated by the Centre for Human Rights, Faculty of Law, University of Pretoria, South Africa.
 ERMA, The European Master’s Programme in Human Rights and Democracy in South East Europe, coordinated by the Centre for Interdisciplinary Studies of the University of Sarajevo in Bosnia Herzegovina and IECOB at the University of Bologna in Italy.
 LATMA, The Master’s Programme in Human Rights and Democratisation in Latin American and the Caribbean, coordinated by the International Centre for Political Studies of the National University of San Martin in Buenos Aires, Argentina.
 APMA, The Master’s Programme in Human Rights  and Democratisation in Asia Pacific, Coordinated by Mahidol University in Bangkok, Thailand.
 CES, The Master’s Programme in Human Rights and Democratisation in the Caucasus, coordinated by the Centre for European Studies at the State University of Yerevan, Armenia.
 ARMA, The Arab Master's Programme in Democracy and Human Rights, coordinated by the University of Saint Joseph in Beirut, Lebanon.

These Regional Programmes offer specialised post-graduate education and training in human rights and democracy from a regional perspective and interdisciplinary content, as well as a multiplicity of research, publications, public events and outreach activities. They are supported by the European Union. 

The Global Campus integrates the educational activities of the Regional Programmes through the exchange of lecturers, researchers and students; the joint planning of curricula for on-campus and online courses; the promotion of global research projects and dissemination activities; the professional development of graduates through internships in inter-governmental organisations; and the strong focus of networking through the Global Campus Alumni Association, as well as support to the alumni associations of the Regional Programmes.

Centre for Human Rights – University of Pretoria

The Centre for Human Rights at the University of Pretoria is an academic department and NGO in South Africa that was established in 1986 as part of domestic efforts against the apartheid system.  Their focus has now extended beyond the borders of South Africa and they currently work towards human rights for the entire continent of Africa.  They hope to improve the education of human rights in Africa while increasing awareness and the number of publications about human rights in Africa.  They also aim to improve women’s rights, people affected by HIV, indigenous  peoples, sexual minorities, and others who are disadvantaged in some way.

The Centre played a crucial role in drafting the Model Law of HIV in South Africa, which was adopted in November by the SADC Parliamentary Forum.  Other important research by the Centre included access to medicines and the African Commission on Human and Peoples’ Rights adopted this resolution.  The Geneva Institute for Human Rights and Humanitarian Law awarded a competitive research assignment to the Centre’s work on the Gender Unit.

The Centre partnered with other organizations in launching the Redlight Children Campaign.  This campaign worked to combat human trafficking and the exploitation and abuse of women and children.  The centre also held a West and Central Africa Consultation on the African Charter on Democracy alongside other organizations.  Discussions were held regarding unconstitutional changes of government, safeguarding the integrity of electoral processes, ending corruption, and aiding in development.  The Centre also held a panel discussion in October regarding maternal health concerning the quadrupling of the maternal mortality rate in the past decade as well as related issues and challenges.

Human Rights Centre - University of Padua

The Human Rights Centre of the University of Padua was one of the first to be established in Europe and its activities focus on the development of interdisciplinary knowledge of human rights and on their promotion, particularly through education and research.

It was founded in 1982 on an initiative of the Faculty of Political Science, as ‘Study and Training Centre on the Rights of the Person and of the Peoples’. In 2011, it became the ‘Interdepartmental Centre on human rights and the rights of Peoples’ and finally in 2013 it was transformed into University Human Rights Centre (Centro di Ateneo). 
In carrying out its activities, the Centre cooperates with regional ombudspersons and other human rights institutions, local authorities, schools and NGOs. The Centre is also responsible for managing the regional Archive ‘Peace Human Rights’, one of the main instruments through which the Region of Veneto promotes the culture of human rights, peace, cooperation to development and solidarity.

The Human Rights Centre is also active at the international level. Besides hosting one of the UNESCO Chairs on “Human Rights, Democracy and Peace” and the European Jean Monnet Excellence Centre, it also cooperates in different ways with the Council of Europe, the European Union, the UN OHCHR, the Multinational CiMic Group, the Anna Lindh Foundation and many others. Moreover, it contributed to the establishment of the European Master in Human Rights and Democratisation (E.MA).

Among its several publications, since 2011, the Human Rights Centre of the University of Padua has been publishing, both in Italian and in English, the Italian Yearbook of Human Rights (Annuario italiano dei diritti umani), a periodical account of how the international human rights monitoring system assesses Italy's behaviour, which aims at fostering an informed and transparent debate on this fundamental feature of public life.

Since 2013, the Centre has been supporting a new MA Degree Programme in Human Rights and Multi-level Governance, taught in English, which is supervised by the Department of Political Science, Law and International Studies, part of the School of Economics and Political Science of the University of Padua.

Center for Human Rights– University of Washington

The Center for Human Rights at University of Washington was established in 2009 as part of an initiative of the Washington state legislature. The center is interdisciplinary but housed under The Henry M. Jackson School of International Studies. The faculty and staff of UWCHR have partnered with the American Civil Liberties Union to small grassroots nonprofits.

Human Rights Program– Harvard Law School

The Human Rights Program (HRP) at Harvard Law School was founded by Professor Emeritus Henry J. Steiner. According to the HRP website, the Program "seeks to inspire and offer guidance to international human rights learning, scholarship, and research at Harvard Law School" and "helps students, advocates, and scholars deepen and disseminate their knowledge of human rights". Established in 1984, it is one of the oldest centers of human rights legal scholarship in the world.

Next to research activities such as conferences and the publication of working papers and books, HRP offers summer and post-graduate fellowships to prepare students for human rights careers. Through the Visiting Fellows Program, HRP seeks to provide "scholars and advocates with an opportunity to step back from teaching or practice and conduct a serious inquiry in the field of human rights". Many leaders in the human rights field from around the globe have passed through HRP, be it as permanent staff or as visiting fellows and professors. These figures include Makau Mutua, Ryan Goodman, Philip Alston, Theodor Meron, and Flávia Piovesan. At the time of writing, visiting HRP are UN Independent Expert on Protection against violence and discrimination based on sexual orientation and gender identity Victor Madrigal-Borloz and UN Child Rights Committee member Benyam Dawit Mezmur.

Gerald L. Neuman, J. Sinclair Armstrong Professor of International, Foreign, and Comparative Law at Harvard Law School, has been the Director of HRP since 2012. In August 2021, Abadir M. Ibrahim became the Associate Director at HRP.

References

External links
Human Rights Centre of the University of Padua 

Human rights organizations